Mohammed Haythami (Arabic:محمد هيثمي) (born 4 December 1993) is a Qatari footballer.

References

External links
 

Qatari footballers
1993 births
Living people
Al Kharaitiyat SC players
Qatar Stars League players
Qatari Second Division players
Association football midfielders
Place of birth missing (living people)